Muhammad Ibrahim Raza Khan Qadri Razvi (1907–1965), was an Indian Islamic scholar, Sufi mystic, orator, author, and leader of Sunni Muslim’s Barelvi movement of Sunni Islam in the Indian subcontinent commonly known as Mufassir E Azam E Hind and Jilani Miya. He was the elder brother of Hammad Raza Khan.

Family
Ibrahim Raza was the elder son of Hujjat al-Islam Hamid Raza Khan Qadri and elder grandson of Ahmad Raza Khan Qadri. He was born on 10th of Rabi ul Aakhir 1325 Hijri (1907 CE)

Education 
His primary education was reading the Quran, Urdu language books and other books took place under the guidance of his grandmother and mother, at the age of 7 he enrolled in Darul Uloom Jamia Razvia Manjar e Islam and at the age of 19 he completed his graduation from Darul Uloom Jamia Razwiya Manjar E Islam in 1344 Hijri (1926 CE). Ibrahim Raza's teachers in Darul Uloom Jamia Razwiya Manjar E Islam who taught him were Maulana Ahsan Ali Sahab Muhadith Faizpuri, his father Hujjat al-Islam  Hamid Raza Khan Qadri and Allamah Sardar Ahmad Muhadith E Pakistan. At the time of graduation ceremony (Dastar Bandi), His father Hujjat al-Islam  Hamid Raza Khan Qadri himself tied a turban (Dastar) on his son's head.

Nikah (Marriage) 
Ibrahim Raza was married with his cousin sister that is Mufti E Azam E Hind Mustafa Raza Khan Qadri Noori elder daughter. This Nikah was arranged by Ahmad Raza Khan Qadri himself when both are kids. Marriage ceremony was held on 2nd of Rabi ul Aakhir 1347 Hijri (1929 CE).

Children 
He has 8 Children 3 daughters and 5 sons. 
 Muhammad Rehan Raza Khan Qadri Razvi (Rehmani Miya)
 Muhammad Tanweer Raza Khan (Mafqood ul Khabr), 
 Tajush Shari'ah Mufti Muhammad Akhtar Raza Khan Qadri Razvi (Azhari Miya)
 Dr Muhammad Qamar Raza Khan Qadri Razvi (Qamar Miya)
 Maulana Muhammad Mannan Raza Khan (Manani Miya)
 One daughter was married to Shaukat Ali Khan of Pilibhit (later went to Pakistan)
 The second daughter was married to Abdul Habib of Badaun, and 
 The third daughter was married within the family to Yunus Raza Khan. 
Among all his children only younger son Maulana Muhammad Mannan Raza Khan is alive.

Ijaazat and Khilaafat 
He is 42nd Imam and Shaykh of the Silsila Aaliyah Qaadiriyah Barakaatiyah Razviyah Nooriyah. At the age of 4 Ibrahim Raza became the Mureed (disciple) of Ahmad Raza Khan Qadri (Grandfather), Ahmad Raza Khan Qadri gave him Khilaafat of Silsila Aaliyah Qaadiriyah Barakaatiyah Razviyah Nooriyah, He has also Khilafat from his father Hujjat al-Islam  Hamid Raza Khan Qadri and Uncle is Mufti E Azam E Hind Mustafa Raza Khan Qadri Noori. In 1372 Hijri he visited Harmain Shariff he got various Ijaazats, for Hadith, Dalaail-e-Khairaat and Hizbul Bahr etc. from Ulama of Makkah al-Mukarramah and Madinah Al Munawwarah.

Monthly A'ala Hazrat magazine 
He started the monthly Ala Hazrat magazine for the propagation of the teachings of the Ahle Sunnat. This magazine was successful and is still in circulation today and currently Mufti Muhammad Subhan Raza Khan Qadri Subhani Miyan is editor-in-chief and Mufti Muhammad Ahsan Raza Khan is editor.

Successorship 
Ibrahim Raza is the successor of his father Hujjat al-Islam  Hamid Raza Khan Qadri. His father gave him all his duties to him which he got from his father Ahmad Raza Khan Qadri, including Sajjadanashini of Khanqah E Aliya Razviya, Mohtamim (Head) of Darul Uloom Jamia Razwiya Manjar E Islam, Mutawalli of Raza Jama Masjid and Dargah E A’ala Hazrat.

Notables Work (Books) 
 Zikrullah
 Nehmatullah
 Hujjatullah
 Fazaa'il-e-Durood Shareef
 Tafseer Surah Balad and
 Tashreeh Qasida Mu'mania

Khulfa (Spiritual Successor) 
He had many Murideen(disciples) and Khulafa (successors), Some of his famous Khulafa names are written below.
 Mufti Muhammad Rehan Raza Khan Qadri Razvi (Elder Son and Successor)
 Mufti Muhammad Akhtar Raza Khan Qadri Razvi (Son and Successor of Mustafa Raza Khan Qadri Razvi Noori)
 Mufti Abdul Wajid Qadr Jilani (Grand Mufti of Netherlands {Holland}).
 Allamah Samsullah Razvi Hasmati Bastawi, Mohalla Bhoorey Khan, Pilibhit, Uttar Pradesh.
 Allamah Abdul Hakim Razvi Jilani, Muzffarpur, Bihar.
 Allamah Sayyad Aafaaz Ahmad Razvi Jilani, Matikunda, Islampur, Uttar Dinajpur, West Bengal.

Death (Wisaal) 
He died after being sick for three consecutive years on 11 Saffar ul Muzaffar 1385 Hijri (12 June 1965 CE). The next day his Janaaza Salaah was prayed at the Islamia Inter College, Janaaza Salah was led by Muhammad Afzal Hussain, and 
 Muhammad Ahsaan Ali, 
 Sayyid Aarif Ali, 
 Sayyid Ijaaz Hussain and 
 Janaab Muhammad Ghaus Khan 
lowered him into his grave. He is buried in Dargah E A’ala Hazrat, Bareilly

See also
 Naqi Ali Khan
 Ahmed Raza Khan Barelvi 
 Hassan Raza Khan
 Hamid Raza Khan
 Mustafa Raza Khan
 Akhtar Raza Khan
 Asjad Raza Khan
 Subhan Raza Khan             
 Manzar-e-Islam
 Jama'at Raza-e-Mustafa
 Dargah-e-Ala Hazrat

References 

1907 births
1965 deaths
Indian Islamic studies scholars
Sufi mystics
Indian Sunni Muslims
Indian Islamic religious leaders
20th-century Indian writers
People from Bareilly
Indian Sunni Muslim scholars of Islam
Indian Sufis
Hanafi fiqh scholars
Barelvis
Islam in the United Kingdom
Indian people of Pashtun descent
Muhammad Ibrahim Raza Khan Qadri
Qadiri order